Peckoltia braueri is a species of catfish in the family Loricariidae. It is native to South America, where it occurs in the basins of the Rio Negro and the Branco River. It is typically found among large boulders in fast-moving riffles. The species reaches 10.3 cm (4.1 inches) SL.

P. braueri appears in the aquarium trade, where it is referred to either as the worm-line peckoltia or by one of three associated L-numbers, which are L-121, L-135, and L-305.

References 

Ancistrini